Cortizo is a Hispanic surname. Notable people with the surname include:

Jordi Cortizo (born 1996), Mexican footballer
Laurentino Cortizo (born 1953), Panamanian politician and businessman 
Pablo Cortizo (born 1989), Argentine footballer

Spanish-language surnames